Shovel Knight Dig is a platform roguelike video game developed by Nitrome and Yacht Club Games and published by Yacht Club Games. It is the third game of the Shovel Knight series and a prequel to the original. It was released September 23, 2022 for the Nintendo Switch, Steam, and Apple Arcade. The game follows protagonist Shovel Knight as he digs and fights enemies through several different worlds to reclaim his stolen treasure bag from Drill Knight. The game received generally favorable reviews from critics.

Gameplay

Shovel Knight Dig is a roguelike platform game. Controlling the eponymous adventurer, the player descends down a hole to stop the villainous Drill Knight and his minions, the Hexcavators. Shovel Knight can jump, dig horizontally and downwards, attack with his shovel, and bounce upon enemies and objects. A playthrough consists of four separate sections, each composed of three procedurally generated levels and a boss fight with one of the Hexcavators. 

As the player progresses between sections, they encounter secret passages, harmful obstacles, and collectable treasure. Players cannot remain in the same location for too long, or an unstoppable buzzsaw will follow them through the level and kill Shovel Knight upon contact. Gameplay is centered around collecting as much treasure as possible to buy useful upgrades at shops, such as increased hit points or limited-use Relics that provide various effects. 

In addition to shops, Shovel Knight can find three golden gears within each level as an optional objective, which give additional heath or a power-up if all are collected. Shovel Knight Dig has been frequently conpared to Downwell, as both feature digging down from a vertical perspective, fighting enemies, and collecting treasure. A permadeath feature causes Shovel Knight to lose all upgrades upon dying, returning the player to the surface with a portion of their collected treasure. At the surface, the player may spend the treasure on tickets that allow for Shovel Knight to start at a later section, sets of armor that provide useful benefits, or keys that can be used to unlock specific doors where new Relics can be unlocked.

Plot
A troublemaking thief named Drill Knight raids Shovel Knight's camp, taking the latter's treasure bag and drilling a hole deep beneath the earth. Angered, Shovel Knight follows Drill Knight down the hole, learning that his adversary has assembled a digging crew of evil knights called the Hexcavators. Shovel Knight later convenes with his adventuring partner Shield Knight, and the two resolve to defeat Drill Knight and reclaim the bag. After descending down the hole and defeating a number of the Hexcavators, Shovel Knight returns to the surface, watching as the nearby Tower of Fate falls underground due to Drill Knight's tunnels. Catching up to the Hexcavators, Shovel Knight learns that the team is searching for a secret treasure, which they intend to sell in exchange for wealth and fame. At Drill Knight's castle, Shield Knight stays behind to hold off the castle's traps, leaving Shovel Knight to face Drill Knight alone. Emerging victorious, Shovel Knight reclaims his bag and returns to the surface with Shield Knight.

If the player performs a number of optional puzzles across a playthrough, they instead experience an alternative ending. During the fight with Drill Knight, Shovel Knight accidentally cracks open the floor, revealing a hidden vault connected to the Tower of Fate. By inserting magical gems obtained by defeating the Hexcavators, Shovel Knight unlocks the chamber, with Drill Knight entering after he realizes that it leads to the secret treasure. Shovel Knight gives pursuit, confronting the Hexcavators just as they unearth the treasure: a magical amulet housing an evil spirit called the Enchantress. Drill Knight accidentally releases the Enchantress, allowing the spirit to transform him into a powerful monster. Shovel Knight and Shield Knight work together to defeat the monster, sealing the Enchantress back inside the amulet. The Tower of Fate begins rising to the surface, forcing them to leave the amulet behind and escape the collapsing hole. In a post-credits scene, Shovel Knight shows his partner an old relic he kept inside the bag, which he uses to open the secret entrance to their former hideout, the Burrow. The two resolve to reclaim the amulet from the Tower of Fate, and prevent it from being used for evil.

Reception

According to review aggregator Metacritic, Shovel Knight Dig received "generally favorable" reviews. Touch Arcade complimented how well a Shovel Knight game translated to mobile. Game Informer felt that the roguelike elements of the game were underwhelming.

Notes

References

2022 video games
Shovel Knight
Apple Arcade games
Nintendo Switch games
Windows games
IOS games
MacOS games
Video games scored by Jake Kaufman
Roguelike video games
Platform games
Indie video games